James Eugene Long (March 19, 1940 – February 2, 2009) was the North Carolina Commissioner of Insurance from 1985 through 2009 retiring as the senior Democratic member of the North Carolina Council of State. He was the third-longest-serving statewide elected official in North Carolina history as of 2009.

Early life
James Eugene Long was born on March 19, 1940 in Burlington, North Carolina to George Attmore Long and Helen Brooks Long. He attended Burlington public school and graduated from Walter M. Williams High School in 1958. From 1958 to 1962 he studied at North Carolina State University, and the following year he attended and graduated from the University of North Carolina at Chapel Hill with a bachelor's degree. He earned a Juris Doctor from the University of North Carolina School of Law in 1966.

Political career 
Long served in the North Carolina House of Representatives (1971–1975) as had his father and grandfather. He also worked as legal counsel to the state house speaker and as Chief Deputy Commissioner of the North Carolina Department of Insurance from 1975 to 1976. Commissioner John R. Ingram fired Long as his deputy in 1976 and Long ran unsuccessfully against his former boss in 1980.

Long became the state's insurance commissioner in January 1985 having been elected in November 1984. He won a sixth term in the 2004 statewide elections. In 2008 he chose not to run for a seventh term. 
Long endorsed Wayne Goodwin to succeed him as Commissioner of Insurance.

Personal life
Long was married to Peg O'Connell and had two children -Dr.Rebecca Long & James Long, and five grandchildren -Steven Long, Morgan Long, Matthew McNeal, Hannah Englehart and Kristin Mcneal Vatcher. In 2009, less than one month after leaving office as Insurance Commissioner, Long suffered a hemorrhagic stroke leaving him in a coma. He died at Rex Hospital in Raleigh on February 2, aged 68.

References

Works cited

External links
News & Observer: Insurance chief modernized state agency
News & Observer profile page

Democratic Party members of the North Carolina House of Representatives
North Carolina Commissioners of Insurance
1940 births
2009 deaths
20th-century American politicians